The Kaskaskia–Shawneetown and Goshen Trail was developed from an 1816 appropriation of funds from the Congress of the United States. This trail served as an important link between the Ohio River town of Shawneetown across Southern Illinois, through the town of Mulkeytown to the then capital of Illinois in Kaskaskia.

Current day
A historical marker was placed at the location where the Kaskaskia–Shawneetown and Goshen Trails intersect, near Illinois Route 142 (IL 142) and Moore Road  in Saline County.

The Silkwood Inn, located in Mulkeytown, Illinois, remains to this day in its original location, having been refurbished by the West Franklin Historical District & Genealogical Society to its original condition.

References

National Register of Historic Places in Saline County, Illinois
Transportation in Illinois